Troy Stetina (born November 16, 1963) is an American guitarist and music educator with more than forty rock and metal instructional methods to his credit, and total sales currently over 1 million units.  He was the director of Rock Guitar Studies at the Wisconsin Conservatory of Music and writer for GuitarOne magazine, and now teaches independently.

Early years
Stetina grew up in Indiana, the youngest in a family of Olympic cyclists, including his brothers Wayne, Dale and Joel, and won several national medals as a teenager. Stetina's mother, an accomplished opera singer, supported his interest in music, and at age 12 she bought him a $60 beginner guitar and little practice amp.

Following formative stints in Private Wave and Wraith, Stetina started giving private guitar lessons part-time at a local music store and found he had a knack for teaching. When a chance meeting with Hal Leonard author/editor Will Schmid occurred at the store, an opportunity to write a heavy-metal instructional method materialized. His first effort was never published due to copyright issues. His second attempt resulted in the highly successful Heavy Metal Rhythm Guitar (Volumes 1 & 2) in 1986, and Heavy Metal Lead Guitar in 1987.

The same year the first book was released, Stetina joined the Wisconsin Conservatory of Music, in Milwaukee. Although he eventually became Director of the Rock Guitar department, he left in the early 1990s to finally pursue a career as a recording artist.

Speed Mechanics for Lead Guitar
Speed Mechanics for Lead Guitar is a guitar tutorial book by Stetina first published in 1990. It is designed to teach lead guitar techniques, how to practice and encourage evolving creativity. It is split into three sections Mechanics, Rhythm and Creativity. It Includes a rock version of "Flight of the Bumblebee" by Nikolai Rimsky-Korsakov, "Caprice No. 10" by Niccolò Paganini and "Prelude in D" by JS Bach.

Associated bands
Private Wave
Wraith
Titan
Second Soul
Dimension X
Exottica

Guitar lessons: book, book/CD & DVD
Troy Stetina Series guitar lessons: 
Metal Rhythm Guitar Volume 1
Metal Rhythm Guitar Volume 2
Speed & Thrash Guitar Method
Metal Lead Guitar Primer
Metal Lead Guitar Volume 1
Metal Lead Guitar Volume 2
Metal Guitar Tricks
Speed Mechanics for Lead Guitar
Fretboard Mastery
Secrets to Writing Killer Metal Songs
Total Rock Guitar
The Ultimate Scale Book
The Ultimate Barre Chord Guide
Left-Handed Guitar
Beginning Rock Rhythm Guitar - DVD
Beginning Rock Rhythm Guitar - VHS
Beginning Rock Rhythm Guitar - book (English)
Beginning Rock Rhythm Guitar - book (Spanish)
Beginning Rock Lead Guitar - DVD
Beginning Rock Lead Guitar - VHS
Beginning Rock Lead Guitar - book (English)
Beginning Rock Lead Guitar - book (Spanish)
Troy Stetina's Guitar Lessons: Hard Rock
Troy Stetina's Guitar Lessons: Funk Rock
Acoustic Rock
The Very Best of Ozzy Osbourne (with Randy Rhoads, Jake E. Lee & Zakk Wylde)
Best of Foo Fighters
Best of Rage Against The Machine
Best of Black Sabbath
Best of Black Sabbath - DVD
Best of Aggro-Metal
Deep Purple Greatest Hits
Modern Rock - DVD
Hard Rock - DVD
 The Best of Joe Satriani by Dale Turner (Troy Stetina recorded all of the music on the accompanying CD)
Dream Theater - Signature Licks
Speed Mechanics for Drums
Speed and thrash metal drum method (with Charlie Bushor)

Books
Troy Stetina Series

References

External links
 Stetina.com
 Discography/Bibliography
 Hal Leonard Corporation - Publisher of the Troy Stetina Series guitar methods

American heavy metal guitarists
Wisconsin Conservatory of Music faculty
1963 births
Living people
Place of birth missing (living people)
20th-century American guitarists